Cubitt is a surname, and may refer to:

Bertram Cubitt KCB (1862–1942), civil servant in the British War Office
Clayton James Cubitt, a.k.a. SIEGE, American art photographer
David Cubitt (born 1965), Canadian television actor
Eleni Cubitt, film maker born in Greece
George Cubitt, 1st Baron Ashcombe (1828–1917), British politician, the son of architect Thomas Cubitt
Henry Cubitt, 2nd Baron Ashcombe CB, TD (1867–1947), politician in the United Kingdom
Henry Cubitt, 4th Baron Ashcombe, (1924–2013), British peer
Henry Cubitt Gooch (1871–1959), British barrister, educationalist and Conservative politician
Hilton Cubitt, key character in The Adventure of the Dancing Men, a Sherlock Holmes short story by Sir Arthur Conan Doyle
James Cubitt (1836–1912), architect of non-conformist chapels
Joseph Cubitt (died 1872), English civil engineer
Les Cubitt (1893–1968), Australian representative rugby league player
Lewis Cubitt (1799–1883), English civil engineer
Mordecai Cubitt Cooke (1825–1914), English botanist and mycologist
Roland Cubitt, 3rd Baron Ashcombe (1899–1962), British peer
Rosalind Maud Cubitt, wife of Bruce Shand, an officer in the British Army
Sonia Cubitt, Baroness Ashcombe (née Keppel) OBE DStJ (1900–1986), the daughter of Hon. George Keppel and his wife Alice
Thomas Cubitt (1788–1855), master builder in London
Thomas Cubitt (British Army officer) KCB CMG DSO (1871–1939), British Army officer of the late 19th and early 20th centuries
William Cubitt (1785–1861), eminent English civil engineer and millwright
William Cubitt (British Army officer) CBE (born 1959), British Army general commanding London District
William Cubitt (politician) (1791–1863), English engineering contractor and politician
William George Cubitt VC DSO (1835–1903), English recipient of the Victoria Cross

Motor manufacturer
Cubitt (car), British motor vehicle manufacturer from 1919 to 1925

See also
Cubitt Artists, artist-run art gallery, artist studios and art educator, founded in 1991
Cubitt Town, area on the Isle of Dogs in Tower Hamlets in London, England
HMS Cubitt (K512), Captain-class frigate of the British Royal Navy that served during World War II
William Cubitt and Company or Holland, Hannen & Cubitts, major building firm responsible for many of the great buildings of London
Accubita
Cubital (disambiguation)
Cubitus